David Baruch Lau (born 13 January 1966) is the Ashkenazi Chief Rabbi of Israel. He was appointed after achieving a majority of the vote on 24 July 2013. He previously served as the Chief Rabbi of Modi'in-Maccabim-Re'ut, Israel, and as the Chief Rabbi of Shoham. Lau is the son of former Ashkenazi Chief Rabbi of Israel Rabbi Yisrael Meir Lau.

Biography
David Baruch Lau was born in Tel Aviv. He studied at Yeshivat Yishuv HaHadash, and later at Yeshivat Beit Matityahu and Ponevezh Yeshiva.

Lau is married to Tzipporah Ralbag.

Rabbinic career

Lau was the first rabbi of the town of Shoham. When the city of Modi'in was established, he was chosen as its Ashkenazi Chief Rabbi, alongside the Sephardi Chief Rabbi Eliyahu Alharar. Along with Alharar, he established Torah classes in the city, including on the subjects of kashrut, eruvim, and Jewish weddings. Lau is a reserve major in the Intelligence Corps.

Lau was one of the first rabbis in Israel to teach responsa over the internet. Since the summer of 2006, he has appeared every Friday on the show "Ask the Rabbi" on HaArutz HaRishon, a show about halakhic questions and answers. Since 1999, he broadcast the daily program "Jewish Point" on the radio station Kol Chai.

On 24 June 2013, Lau was elected as Ashkenazi Chief Rabbi of Israel. At the time, he was the youngest person (at 47) to be elected to that position. The inauguration took place on 14 August 2013 at the official residence of the President of Israel.
In 2020, during the coronavirus pandemic, Lau declared that no one should touch or kiss mezuzot, in order to prevent further spread of the virus.

Published works
Lau has published articles in journals such as Tehumin, and edited a book of his father's responsa titled Yichil Yisrael. He also edited and published a book in memory of his grandfather, Yitzchak Yedidya Frankel. In 2008, he published his book Maskil LeDavid on issues of genealogy, conversion, military law, and other matters.

Controversies

Lau took a semikhah (rabbinic ordination) test in 1993. Dov Lior, the administering rabbi, asserted that Lau brought papers with answers to previous tests into the exam room. Lau denied the allegations, but he was disqualified. He was re-tested in 1994, and passed the exam.

In his first week in office as Chief Rabbi of Israel, Lau referred to African-Americans who play basketball on Israeli teams as kushim. Although in a Biblical context, it refers to the ancient Kingdom of Kush, it is currently considered a derogatory term for Black people. His comments were widely condemned as racist, and MK Amram Mitzna and Ethiopian-born MK Pnina Tamanu-Shata called upon him to apologize. Naftali Bennett, however, defended Lau.

In 2018, Lau was accused of trying to appoint his brother-in-law, Mordechai Ralbag, as a replacement for a rabbinical judge who was investigating corruption involving hekdeshot (Haredi non-profit property trusts). Lau and the Ralbag family denied any wrongdoing. Later that year, during the immediate aftermath of a shooting at a Conservative synagogue, Lau gave an interview to a Haredi newspaper during which he avoided calling the attack venue a synagogue, referring to it only as "a place with profound Jewish flavor". The omission was taken as a snub by Jews from non-Orthodox congregations.

In August 2019, Lau instructed the chevra kadisha to delay the burial in Jerusalem of the mother of an American Haredi man, Yisrael Meir Kin, until he agreed to give his wife a get (religious writ of divorce). Kin's relatives in Israel deposited $20,000 with the Supreme Rabbinical Court and signed a document pledging to do what they could to convince him. Kin accused Lau of corruption, and said that no one from Lau's office had contacted him. He said that the divorce papers had been filed ten years earlier at a religious court in Monsey, New York, and Lau, who was related to his wife, had taken sides in the case. A relative of Lau denied that he was related, but Haaretz determined that they are in fact related, though distantly. Lau's office responded to Kin's statements, saying that the chief rabbi was not aware of the family relation while dealing with the case, and that they were sorry that Kin, who had denied his wife a get "for more than 15 years", was "continuing his refusal despite the agreements reached... [Lau] will continue his unwavering war on the phenomenon of get-refusal, and "will do everything he can, including [imposing] the most severe sanctions, to end any case of get-refusal that may develop". Officials in the Ministry of Religious Services said the chief rabbi has no jurisdiction over burial matters.

In December 2021, Lau was criticised for attending the shiva of prominent Haredi author Chaim Walder, who had committed suicide amidst allegations of being involved in sexual abuse against minors and married women. Natan Slifkin wrote in a blogpost

 

Lau subsequently issued a statement encouraging sexual assault victims to come forward and report the abuse to the proper authorities.

References

External link

1966 births
20th-century Israeli rabbis
21st-century Israeli rabbis
Chief rabbis of Israel
Israeli Orthodox rabbis
Living people
People from Tel Aviv
Israeli people of Polish-Jewish descent